Alexander Fehling (born 29 March 1981) is a German film and stage actor. He is best known for portraying Staff Sgt. Wilhelm in the 2009 Quentin Tarantino World War II film Inglourious Basterds and Jonas Hollander in the Showtime original series Homeland as the boyfriend of Claire Danes's character Carrie Mathison.

Life and career
Fehling was born in East Berlin, East Germany. He studied acting at the Ernst Busch Academy of Dramatic Arts from 2003 until 2007.

He received the  award in the Actor category for his portrayal of Sven Lehnert in the 2006 film, And Along Come Tourists.

Fehling is best known to English-speaking audiences for his role as German Master Sgt. Wilhelm in Quentin Tarantino's World War II 2009 film Inglourious Basterds. Fehling is incorrectly referred to as a Staff Sgt by the English captions. Fehling also dubs his performance in the German version of the film.

Fehling appeared as a series regular in the fifth season of the Showtime original series Homeland, which began airing in October 2015. He played Jonas Hollander, a legal counsel for the Düring Foundation and boyfriend of Claire Danes's character Carrie Mathison.

Awards
 2007: The  (Young German Cinema Award) in the best actor category for his role as Sven Lehnert in And Along Come Tourists (2006)
 2011: The Shooting Stars Award by European Film Promotion at the Berlin International Film Festival.

Theater and filmography

Theater credits
 Schneewittchen by Robert Walser, directed by Thorsten Lensing and Jan Hein (2005)
  by Oscar Straus, directed by Robert Borgmann (2006)
  by Friedrich Schiller, directed by Peter Stein (2007)

Film
 And Along Come Tourists (2007, Director: Robert Thalheim) – Sven Lehnert
 Buddenbrooks (2007, Director: Heinrich Breloer) – Morten Schwarzkopf
 Storm (2009, Director: Hans-Christian Schmid) – Patrick Färber
 Inglourious Basterds (2009, Director: Quentin Tarantino) – Master Sgt. Wilhelm / Pola Negri
  (2009, Director: Frieder Wittich) – Bernd
 Goethe! (2010, Director: Philipp Stölzl) – Johann Goethe
 If Not Us, Who? (2011) – Andreas Baader
  (2011)
  (2012) – Cornelis Schmidt
 Erased (The Expatriate) (2012) – Floyd
  (2013,) – Eddie Weber
 Labyrinth of Lies (2014) – Johann Radmann
 Posthumous (2014) – Erik Alder
 Atomic Falafel (2015) – Oli
 In Times of Fading Light (2017) – Sascha Umnitzer
  (2015) – David Burger
 Three Peaks (2017, Director: Jan Zabeil) – Aaron
 The Captain (2017) – Junker
 Das Ende der Wahrheit (2019) – Patrick Lemke
 A Hidden Life (2019) – Lawyer Feldman
 Gut gegen Nordwind (2019) – Leo
 ''Seneca – On the Creation of Earthquakes (2023) - Decimus

References

External links

 
 Horstermann Agency
 Alexander Fehling  at shooting-stars.eu

1981 births
Living people
German male film actors
German male stage actors
Male actors from Berlin
Ernst Busch Academy of Dramatic Arts alumni
People from East Berlin
People from Lichtenberg